Vladimir Mikhailovich Sangi (18 March 1935) is a Nivkh writer and publicist from Russia. He writes in Nivkh and Russian.

Biography
Sangi was born 18 March 1935 in the nomadic settlement Nabil (now a village in Sakhalin Oblast). He graduated from Herzen University in 1959 and became a member of the Union of Soviet Writers in 1962. In 1965 he completed upper literature courses. In 1967 he joined the Communist Party of the Soviet Union.

Sangi settled in Moscow in the mid-1960s, and since 1975 has been a chairman of the Union of Russian Writers. After perestroika he moved back to Sakhalin, where in 1993 he was elected chief of the tribes of Ket Eastern Sakhalin and the basin of the Tym River. He is also a member of the International League for Human Rights under the United Nations Economic and Social Council.

A speaker of the East Sakhalin dialect of Nivkh, Sangi is the founder of Nivkh literature, one of the creators of the reformed Nivkh alphabet (introduced by an act of the Council of Ministers of the Soviet Union on 29 June 1979), and the author of the rules of Nivkh orthography, a Nivkh language primer, a Nivkh language textbook, textbooks for Nivkh schools, and books for reading in Nivkh, as well as a publisher of Nivkh translations of Russian classics.

In his work it's clear that a connection is preserved in myths between man and nature, the world of animals and the spiritual forces that define material existence.

At the UNESCO headquarters in Paris on 18 March 2015 there was a round table discussion entitled "Protection and Promotion of the Cultural and Linguistic Heritage of the Indigenous Peoples of Northern Sakhalin (Nivkhs)." The event was timed to coincide with Vladimir Sangi's eightieth birthday. The event proceeded under the auspices of the Commission of the Russian Federation for UNESCO. It was organized by Sakhalin Energy, the government of Sakhalin Oblast, and the Permanent Delegation of the Russian Federation to UNESCO.

Works
 Нивхские легенды, 1961
 Солёные брызги, 1962
 Семипёрая птица, 1964, 1967
 Ложный гон, 1965, 1966
 Первый выстрел, 1965
 Легенды Ыхмифа, 1967, 1974
 Женитьба Кевонгов, 1975, 1977
 Месяц рунного хода, 1985
 Путешествие в стойбище Лунво, 1985
 Человек Ыхмифа, 1986
 Морская поэма, 1988
 Эпос сахалинских нивхов, 2013

Honours
 Maxim Gorky RSFSR State Prize (1988) — for his novel Путешествие в стойбище Лунво (1985)
 Order of the Badge of Honour (1977)
 Jubilee Medal "In Commemoration of the 100th Anniversary of the Birth of Vladimir Ilyich Lenin" (1970)
 Medal for Fidelity to the North (2009)
 Order of Friendship (2006)

References

Anthologies

External links
 Фундаментальная электронная библиотека "Русская литература и фольклор" (ФЭБ) (FEB Encyclopaedia of Russian Literature): article by B.L. Komanovskii 
 
 Большая книга о малом народе // Russian newspaper, 1 November 2013
 Владимир Санги. Если не я, то никто // Literary newspaper, 2015, #12(6502)
 Ряд мероприятий провела компания «Сахалин Энерджи Инвестмент Компани Лтд.» к 80 летию писателя

Communist Party of the Soviet Union members
Social realist artists
1935 births
Nivkh
Russian people of indigenous Siberian descent
People from Sakhalin Oblast
20th-century Russian short story writers
Living people